This is a list of monuments in Kirkop, Malta, which are listed on the National Inventory of the Cultural Property of the Maltese Islands.

List 

|}

References

Kirkop
Kirkop